Austrostipa densiflora is a widespread species of grass found in south eastern Australia. Often found on rocky, poor quality soils in woodland.

References

External links

densiflora
Bunchgrasses of Australasia
Flora of New South Wales
Flora of Queensland
Flora of Victoria (Australia)
Flora of South Australia